Velká nad Veličkou is a municipality and village in Hodonín District in the South Moravian Region of the Czech Republic. It has about 2,800 inhabitants.

Geography
It lies in the White Carpathians mountain range. The Velička River flows through the municipality.

History
The first written mention of Velká nad Veličkou is from 1228, in a deed of King Ottokar I of Bohemia.

Culture
Velká nad Veličkou lies in the ethnographic region Horňácko.

Sights
The landmark of Velká nad Veličkou is the Church of Saint Mary Magdalene. The original Gothic church was built in the 14th century. At the end of the 15th century, it was fortified and served as a refuge during raids from neighboring lands. After it was burned down by Tatars in the 17th century, it was rebuilt in its current form in the mid-18th century. The church complex includes a wall around the church and a valuable statue of St. John of Nepomuk from 1747.

Twin towns – sister cities

Velká nad Veličkou is twinned with:
 Nowy Dwór Gdański, Poland

Gallery

References

External links

Villages in Hodonín District
Horňácko